Gustaf Otto Rosenberg, termed Otto Rosenberg in publications, born June 9, 1872 in Gothenburg, Sweden, died November 30, 1948, was a Swedish botanist; son of Johan Olof Rosenberg.

Rosenberg studied in Uppsala, Stockholm and Bonn, he gained a bachelor's degree at the University of Uppsala in 1895, and a PhD in Bonn in 1899 where he studied under Eduard Strasburger (1844–1912). His PhD thesis addressed the cytological changes that occur in the cells of the Sundew plant (Drosera) when they are irritated. Also in 1899, he became an associate professor of Botany at the University of Stockholm. Rosenberg worked at the Botanical Institute in Stockholm from 1904 and was promoted to a professorship in plant anatomy and cytology in 1911, at the same university.

Later, Rosenberg studied meiosis in the hybrid of Drosera longifolia crossed with D. rotundifolia, this was the first cytologically  examined  plant  hybrid. The  former of the two parent species contained 40 chromosomes,  the latter  20; however, the near-sterile hybrid  (D.  obovata) contained  30  chromosomes.
This Drosera 'scheme’ was almost certainly the first example of the  parents  of  a  hybrid being identified through  the  analysis  of  chromosome  pairing  during meiosis.

Rosenberg's writings dealt mainly in cytology and plant embryology and he became very prominent in these fields.  In 1917 he was elected a  member of the Royal Swedish Academy of Sciences and, in 1925, a member of the Royal Danish Academy of Sciences and Letters. Rosenberg became a Commander of the Order of the Polar Star, November 22, 1932.

References

1872 births
1948 deaths
People from Gothenburg
Swedish botanists
University of Bonn alumni
Swedish scientists